Archigyrodactylus is a genus of monogeneans in the family Gyrodactylidae. It consists of one species, Archigyrodactylus archigyrodactylus Mizelle & Kritsky, 1967.

References

Gyrodactylidae
Monogenea genera
Monotypic platyhelminthes genera